Sir Judson Graham Day,  (born 3 May 1933) is a British-Canadian business executive, lawyer and corporate director who now lives in Hantsport, Nova Scotia.

Early life and education
Born in Halifax, Nova Scotia, he graduated from Dalhousie Law School with an LL.B. in 1956 and for a while appeared on Singalong Jubilee.

Career
He was chairman and CEO of British Shipbuilders from 1983 to 1986, and chairman and CEO of the Austin Rover Group from 1986 until 1991. From 1989 to 1993 he was chairman of Cadbury Schweppes, between its last two family chairmen, Sir Adrian Cadbury and Sir Dominic Cadbury. He was chancellor of Dalhousie University from 1994 to 2001. He was chairman of Hydro One, but left following controversy over levels of executive and board compensation.  He is now counsel at Stewart McKelvey, an Atlantic Canadian law firm.

Day has received a number of honours. He was knighted in 1989 by Queen Elizabeth II and was inducted into the Canadian Business Hall of Fame in 2006. Day was appointed a member of the Order of Nova Scotia by Lieutenant Governor of Nova Scotia Mayann Francis in 2011  and an Officer of the Order of Canada by Governor General of Canada David Johnston in 2014. He has received honorary degrees from Dalhousie University and several universities in the United Kingdom.

References

External links

Sir Graham Day page at Stewart McKelvey

1933 births
Living people
British businesspeople
Businesspeople awarded knighthoods
Businesspeople from Nova Scotia
Canadian expatriates in England
Canadian university and college chancellors
Schulich School of Law alumni
Knights Bachelor
Lawyers in Nova Scotia
Members of the Order of Nova Scotia
People from Halifax, Nova Scotia
People from Hants County, Nova Scotia
Rover Company
Dalhousie University alumni
Canadian corporate directors
Officers of the Order of Canada